Albert Kaye (30 April 1872 – 16 September 1935) was an English professional footballer who played as a centre-forward in the Football League for Sheffield Wednesday and Stockport County. He also played for Chatham, West Ham United and Distillery.

Kaye played for Staveley and Eckington before joining Sheffield Wednesday for the 1897–98 season.

After a spell at Chatham, he joined West Ham United along with Walter Tranter for the start of their inaugural season of 1900–01. There, he played mainly as inside-left, appearing once as a centre-forward and twice as left-winger. He was part of the team that played in West Ham's first fixture against Gravesend United, which the Hammers won 7–0. In all, he made 14 Southern League First Division and six FA Cup appearances for the east London club, his final appearance coming on 12 January 1901 against Bristol City. In June 1901, he and Tranter joined Belfast club Distillery.

He returned to England and League football with Stockport County in 1903.

References

External links
Albert Kaye at westhamstats.info

1872 births
1935 deaths
People from Staveley, Derbyshire
Footballers from Derbyshire
English footballers
Association football forwards
Staveley F.C. players
Sheffield Wednesday F.C. players
Chatham Town F.C. players
West Ham United F.C. players
Lisburn Distillery F.C. players
Stockport County F.C. players
English Football League players
Southern Football League players